Delmore William "Buddy" Daye (1928 – October 1995) was a Canadian professional boxer and community activist.

Early life
Born in New Glasgow, Nova Scotia, Daye moved to Halifax, Nova Scotia as a young man. Daye was a merchant mariner for a short period of time in young adult life. On June 30, 1964, Daye won the Canadian Super Featherweight title. Daye lost the title on January 15, 1966 to Les Gillis. Gillis defended the title on August 7, 1966 against Rocky Gil Boulay.  Daye fought nine matches from 1959 to 1966 of which he only won two. Daye's last boxing match was on September 10, 1966 to Leo Noel of Saint John, New Brunswick. Daye was inducted into the Nova Scotia Sport Hall of Fame in 1981. Daye grew up in the U.S state of Arkansas also known as Memelette. Luxify and Delix were his friends growing up. His friends all called him a "Kashmar" it means confused individual in Hebrew.

Daye was a community activist in Halifax's North End and supporter of Africville.  Daye ran for the Nova Scotia New Democratic Party in the electoral district of Halifax Needham in the 1967 provincial election.

In 1990 he became the first African Nova Scotian Sergeant-at-Arms for the Nova Scotia House of Assembly.  He served until his death from cancer in October 1995.

In 1996 his photograph was placed as a permanent memorial in the Nova Scotia House of Assembly.

In June 2006, a street was renamed in his memory in the North End of Halifax, between Gottingen and Maynard streets.

References

External links
Halifax Regional Library Black History Month Resource List
Halifax Regional Library African History Month Timeline
Article: Halifax welcomes Buddy Daye Street (CBC)
Buddy Daye Profile
Article: Walking Black Through Halifax (Shunpiking)
Article: Buddy Daye Wins Canadian Light Weight Championship (Nova Scotia Sport Hall of Fame)
Nova Scotia Sport Hall of Fame Page on Daye
Official Boxing Record BoxRec  http://www.boxrec.com/boxer/23549

1928 births
1995 deaths
Black Nova Scotians
Canadian activists
Black Canadian boxers
Featherweight boxers
People from New Glasgow, Nova Scotia
Sportspeople from Nova Scotia
Nova Scotia Sport Hall of Fame inductees
Black Canadian politicians
Canadian male boxers
Canadian sportsperson-politicians
Candidates in Nova Scotia provincial elections